Mike Lerner is an American metal guitarist best known for his work with Behold... The Arctopus.

Career
Lerner began playing the piano when he was five years old.  He attended New York University where he received a degree and met fellow musician Colin Marston. The two began to play together and eventually formed the tech-metal group Behold... the Arctopus. They were later joined by drummer Charlie Zeleny.

Equipment
Lerner is endorsed by Ibanez Guitars and is often seen performing on their RG model. His first Ibanez guitar was a bright yellow coloured RG565 that he found at a pawn shop in the mid-1990s. He also uses a Peavey 5150 head and a Mesa Boogie 4x12 cabinet.

Discography

With Behold... The Arctopus
2002: We Need a Drummer (demo, MP3.com)
2003: Arctopocalypse Now... Warmageddon Later (demo, self-released)
2005: Nano-Nucleonic Cyborg Summoning (EP, Troubleman Unlimited, Epicene Sound Systems)
2006: Split with Orthrelm  (Split, Crucial Blast Records, Eyes of Sound)
2007: Memphis 3-6-06 (Video, s.l.a.p.)
2007: Skullgrid (album, Black Market Activities)
2012: Horrorscension (album, Black Market Activities)
2016: Cognitive Emancipation (album)
2020: Hapeleptic Overtrove (album, Willowtip Records)

As Direwolf
2007: Beyond the Lands of Human Existence (album, Blastard Entertainment)

Other appearances

2006: Astomatous  - The Beauty Of Reason
Performed guitar on the track "The Ascetic Ponders"

See also
Colin Marston
Black Market Activities

External links
Blastard Entertainment Website
Mike Lerner on Myspace

References

American male guitarists
Living people
1981 births
Behold... The Arctopus members
21st-century American guitarists
21st-century American male musicians